There are two butendioic acids, depending on if they are cis or trans:

Maleic acid, cis
Fumaric acid, trans